The 1961 season was Djurgårdens IF's 61st in existence, their 18th season in Division 2 and their 1st consecutive season in the league. They were competing in Division 2 Svealand and its play-off for the 1962 Allsvenskan.

Player statistics
Appearances for competitive matches only.

|}

Goals

Total

Division 2 Svealand

Promotion play-offs

Competitions

Overall

Division 2 Svealand

League table

Matches

Allsvenskan promotion play-offs

League table

Matches

Nordic Cup
The tournament continued from the 1960 season and continued into the 1962 season.

Semi-finals

References

Djurgårdens IF Fotboll seasons
Djurgarden